Mount Corruption is an  mountain summit located in Custer County, Idaho, United States.

Description
Mount Corruption ranks as the 21st-highest peak in Idaho and is part of the Lost River Range which is a subset of the Rocky Mountains. The mountain is set on land managed by Salmon–Challis National Forest. Neighbors include Little Regret Peak two miles south, line parent Mount Breitenbach, 3.4 miles south, Leatherman Peak is 3.8 miles to the southwest, and Borah Peak, the highest peak in Idaho, is 5.6 miles to the west-northwest. Precipitation runoff from the mountain's slopes drains to tributaries of the Pahsimeroi River.

Climate
Based on the Köppen climate classification, Mount Corruption is located in an alpine subarctic climate zone with long, cold, snowy winters, and cool to warm summers. Winter temperatures can drop below −10 °F with wind chill factors below −30 °F.

See also
 List of mountain peaks of Idaho

References

Gallery

External links
 Mount Corruption: Idaho: A Climbing Guide

Mountains of Idaho
Mountains of Custer County, Idaho
North American 3000 m summits
Salmon-Challis National Forest